Andrey Anatolyevich Krivov (born 14 November 1985 in Komsomolsky, Chamzinsky District, Mordovia) is a Russian race walker.

Achievements

External links 

1985 births
Living people
Sportspeople from Mordovia
Russian male racewalkers
Olympic male racewalkers
Olympic athletes of Russia
Athletes (track and field) at the 2012 Summer Olympics
Universiade gold medalists in athletics (track and field)
Universiade gold medalists for Russia
Medalists at the 2011 Summer Universiade
Medalists at the 2013 Summer Universiade
World Athletics Championships athletes for Russia
Russian Athletics Championships winners